Félix Pissarro (also known by the pseudonym Jean Roch; 24 July 1874 – 29 November 1897) was a nineteenth-century French painter, etcher and caricaturist.  Known as Titi in his family circle, he was the third son of the painter Camille and Julie Pissarro.

Life 
He was born in Pontoise, Paris, in the year of the first Impressionist exhibition. Like his siblings Lucien and Georges, he spent his formative years surrounded by his father's fellow artists such as Claude Monet and Pierre-Auguste Renoir who frequented the Pissarro home. Félix's works very early demonstrated great strength and originality. His father regarded him as the most promising of his sons but before he was able to realise his full potential, he contracted tuberculosis and died in a sanatorium at 262 Kew Road, Kew (which is now in the London Borough of Richmond upon Thames), at the age of 23. He is buried in Richmond Cemetery.

References

Felix
1874 births
1897 deaths
People from Pontoise
19th-century French Sephardi Jews
Jewish painters
19th-century French painters
French male painters
French etchers
French people of Portuguese-Jewish descent
French caricaturists
Burials at Richmond Cemetery
Sibling artists
19th-century French male artists